Shufa ( haqa al-shufea, often translated as "preemption") is an Islamic concept similar to the right of first refusal in Western law.

The ninth-century Sunan ibn Majah collects hadith related to shufa. For example:

References

Islamic law